Magua is a genus of Australian intertidal spiders containing the single species, Magua wiangaree. It was  first described by V. T. Davies in 1998, and has only been found in Australia.

References

Desidae
Spiders of Australia
Spiders described in 1998
Taxa named by Valerie Todd Davies